Daniel Litman (born 19 October 1990) is an Israeli actor and model. He is known for his roles in Mossad 101 and The Little Drummer Girl.

Litman was born and raised in Haifa, Israel, to a family of Ashkenazi Jewish descent. His father is Avi, and his mother is Liza. His elder brother is Or Litman.

Filmography

References

External links 
 

Israeli male film actors
Israeli male television actors
Israeli Ashkenazi Jews
Living people
1990 births
Male actors from Haifa
21st-century Israeli male actors